Andrea Romano may refer to:

 Andrea Romano (voice director) (born 1955), American casting director, voice director and voice actress 
 Andrea Romano (politician) (born 1967), Italian politician
 Andrea Romanò (born 1993), Italian footballer